Gymnancyla barbatella is a species of snout moth in the genus Gymnancyla. It was described by Nikolay Grigoryevich Erschoff in 1874 and is known from Russia, Uzbekistan and the Gobi desert.

References

Moths described in 1874
Phycitini
Moths of Asia